Hippolyte Arnoux (active ca. 1860 – ca. 1890) was a French photographer and publisher. He was one of the first photographers to produce images of Egypt and documented the Suez Canal project with extensive photographs and a publication.

Life and career
Very little is known about this photographer, other than that he was active in the Nile Valley from about 1869 through to at least 1890. His place and date of birth are unknown, but he is known to have been French. Similarly, his place and date of death are unknown, as is his final resting place.
 
By the 1850s, tourist travel to Egypt created strong demand for photographs as souvenirs. A small group of early photographers, mostly of French origin, made their way to Cairo and the Nile Valley to capitalise on this demand. These pioneering photographers included Félix Bonfils (1831-1885); Gustave Le Gray (1820-1884), brothers Henri and Emile Bechard; the British-Italian brothers Antonio Beato (c. 1832–1906) and Felice Beato and the Greek Zangaki brothers. Although it is unclear when Arnoux first travelled to Egypt, he appears to have been in Egypt around the same time as this group of pioneering photographers. Some evidence points to a collaboration between Arnoux and the Zangaki Brothers, but the precise nature of any such relationship is unclear.

Arnoux is known to have established a studio in Place de Consuls in Port Said in the 1860s, and later a different studio at Place Ferdinand de Lesseps also in Port Said. He also operated a floating darkroom in Port Said in the 1860s and 70s, of which a photograph survives. He may have been the official photographer, appointed by the Universal Company of the Suez Canal, to document the work on the canal. In this capacity, Arnoux may have hired the Zangaki Brothers to assist him. At a later date, Arnoux was in partnership with the British-Italian photographer, Antonio Beato.

In 1874, Arnoux instigated litigation against the Zangaki Brothers and one Spiridion Antippa accusing them of usurping his intellectual property. Arnoux was successful and on 29 June 1876, the Court of Ismailia, recognized them as "guilty of usurpation of artistic and industrial property and unfair competition."

Works
During the 1860s, he documented the excavation of the Suez Canal and published the resulting photographs as Album du Canal de Suez. At the same time, he may have occasionally worked with the Port Said photographic studio, Zangaki Brothers on the project to document the Suez Canal. He also produced numerous portraits of Egyptian peoples, probably made in his studio.

Selected images of Egyptian People

Selected images of the Suez Canal project

See also
 History of photography
 List of Orientalist artists
 Orientalism

References

External links
Anglo-American Name Authority File, s.v. "Arnoux, Hippolyte", LC Control Number nr 98007151, cited 6 February 2006.
Canal Maritime de Suez: map of route of Suez Canal, and views of principal points along the route, local Egyptian officials and major figures of the canal constuction [sic], Suez, Egypt. Hippolyte Arnoux. Canadian Centre for Architecture, cited 24 April 2020.
Hippolyte Arnoux: photographe de l'union des mers. Exhibition catalogue. Paris: Centre historique des archives nationales, 1996.
Union List of Artists Names, s.v. "Arnoux, Hippolyte", cited 6 February 2006.
Vintage Photography - Hippolyte Arnoux
Fostinum: Hippolyte Arnoux
Arnoux, Hippolyte (ca. 1880) Various photos in Egypt of people on camels, the Pyramids and the Sphinx QUT Digital Collections
Arnoux, Hippolyte (ca. 1880) Photos of women of Point Said - Egypt. QUT Digital Collections
Arnoux, Hippolyte (ca. 1880) Photos Port Said - Egypt. QUT Digital Collections

19th-century French photographers
Documentary photographers
French photojournalists
Year of birth uncertain
Year of death uncertain
Photography in Egypt
Pioneers of photography
Early photographers in Egypt